MAATAC is a 1979 board game published by Superior Models, Inc.

Gameplay
MAATAC is a game involving armored vehicles that the five empires which were introduced in Starfleet Wars utilize, and are the rules intended for the MAATAC miniatures line by Superior Models.

Reception
Alex R. Sabo reviewed MAATAC in The Space Gamer No. 34. Sabo commented that "Anyone wanting a set of SF miniatures rules incorporating armor, air, and infantry should consider MAATAC, at all times keeping in mind its simplicity."

Reviews
Dragon #29
Science Fiction Review #33

References

Board games introduced in 1979